Josiah James Meeker (born January 30, 1990), who goes by the stage name Josiah James, is an American Christian musician and guitarist, who plays alternative rock, pop rock, and indie rock music. Meeker has released two studio albums, The Morning Light (2009) and All Forgotten Things (2012). He has released three extended plays, Oceans (2010), Heaven Came Down (2012), and Identity (2014).

Early and personal life
Josiah James Meeker was born on January 30, 1990, in Auburn, California, to Wesley and Lynda Meeker (née, Goldstein), where he was homeschooled with his three older siblings, two brothers and a sister. He became a songwriter at fourteen years-old, and started playing the guitar, while his parents owned and operated a local coffeehouse. He started full time touring, when he was just 18 years old.

Music history
His music recording career began in 2009, with the studio album, The Morning Light, that was independently released on April 25, 2009. He released two extended plays, Oceans on November 2, 2010, and Heaven Came Down on November 27, 2012, a Christmas-themed musical work. The next release was his second studio album, All Forgotten Things, that was released on January 6, 2012. He released, Identity, on May 13, 2014, which was his third extended play. Songs from Identity were covered by popular Christian musician Lincoln Brewster and band Audio Adrenaline, with fans taking the songs as their own works, respectively.

Discography
Studio albums
 The Morning Light (April 25, 2009)
 All Forgotten Things (January 6, 2012)
EPs
 Oceans (November 2, 2010)
 Heaven Came Down (November 27, 2012)
 Identity (May 13, 2014)

References

External links
 
 Professional Facebook profile
 Personal Facebook profile

1990 births
American performers of Christian music
Living people
People from Auburn, California
Singers from California
Songwriters from California
21st-century American singers
21st-century American male singers
American male songwriters